Chase is a given name in the English language, especially popular in the United States. The given name is a transferred use of the surname.

People with the given name

A
Chase Allen (linebacker) (born 1993), American football player
Chase Allen (tight end) (born 1997), American football player
Chase Anderson (born 1987), American baseball player
Chase Austin (born 1989), American racing driver

B
Chase Baird (born 1988), American musician
Chase Baker (born 1988), American football player
Chase Balisy (born 1992), American ice hockey player
Chase Beeler (born 1986), American football player
Chase Blackburn (born 1983), American football player
Chase Boone (born 1995), American soccer player
Chase Brice (born 1998), American football player
Chase Briscoe (born 1994), American racing driver
Chase Bromstedt (born 1998), American soccer player
Chase Brooks, American soccer coach
Chase Brown (born 2000), Canadian American football player
Chase Bryant (born 1992), American singer-songwriter
Chase Buchanan (born 1991), American tennis player
Chase Budinger (born 1988), American volleyball player
Chase Buford (born 1988), American basketball coach
Chase Bullock (born 1986), American football player

C
Chase Cabre (born 1997), American stock car racing driver
Chase Carey (born 1953), Irish-American businessman
Chase Carter (born 1997), Bahamian fashion model
Chase Cartwright (born 1992), American football coach
Chase A. Clark (1883–1966), American judge
Chase Claypool (born 1998), Canadian-born American football player
Chase Clement (born 1986), American football player
Chase Clement (tight end) (born 1989), American football player
Chase Clements (1901–1971), American football player
Chase Coffman (born 1986), American football player
Chase Coleman III (born 1975), American hedge fund manager
Chace Crawford (born 1985), American actor
Chase Crawford (born 1996), American actor

D
Chase Daniel (born 1986), American football player
Chase d'Arnaud (born 1987), American baseball player
Chase De Jong (born 1993), American baseball player
Chase DeLauter (born 2001), American baseball player
Chase De Leo (born 1995), American ice hockey player
Chase Dollander (born 2001), American baseball player
Chase N Dough (born 1991), American record producer

E
Chase Ealey (born 1994), American track and field athlete
Chase Edmonds (born 1996), American football player
Chase Elliott (born 1995), American racing driver
Chase Ellison (born 1993), American actor

F
Chase Farris (born 1993), American football player
Chase Fieler (born 1992), American basketball player
Chase Finlay (born 1990), American ballet dancer
Chase Ford (born 1990), American football player

G
Chase Garbers (born 1999), American football player
Chase Gasper (born 1996), American soccer player
Chase Griffin (born 2000), American football player

H
Chase Hanna (born 1994), American golfer
Chase Hansen (born 1993), American football player
Chase Harrison (born 1984), American soccer player
Chase Headley (born 1984), American baseball player
Chase Hilgenbrinck (born 1982), American soccer player
Chase Holbrook (born 1985), American football coach
Chase Holfelder, American singer-songwriter
Chase Hooper (born 1999), American mixed martial artist

I
Chase Icon (born 2001), American singer-songwriter

J
Chase Janes (born 2001), American racing driver
Chase Jarvis (born 1971), American photographer
Chase Jeter (born 1997), American basketball player
Chase Johnsey, American ballet dancer
Chase Josey (born 1995), American snowboarder
Chase Joynt, Canadian filmmaker

K
Chase Kalisz (born 1994), American swimmer
Chase Wilmot Kennedy (1859–1936), American army officer
Chase Koch (born 1977), American businessman
Chase Koepka (born 1994), American golfer

L
Chase Lambin (born 1979), American baseball player
Chase Langford (born 1960), American painter
Chase Litton (born 1995), American football player
Chase Lucas (born 1997), American football player
Chase Lyman (born 1982), American football player
Chase Lyons (1866–??), American baseball player

M
Chase Masterson (born 1963), American actress and singer
Chase Mattioli (born 1989), American stock car racing driver
Chase McBride (born 1988), American songwriter
Chase McEachern (1994–2006), Canadian hockey player
Chase McLaughlin (born 1996), American football player
Chase Miller (born 1987), American racing driver
Chase Minnaar (born 1986), South African rugby union footballer
Chase Minnifield (born 1989), American football player
Chase Minter (born 1992), American soccer player
Chase Mishkin (1937–2022), American theatrical producer
Chase Montgomery (born 1983), American stock car racing driver
Chase Morison (born 1992), South African rugby union footballer

N
Chase Niece (born 1998), American soccer player
Chase Nielsen (1917–2007), American air force officer

O
Chase Oliver (born 1984/1985), American politician
Chase Onorati (born 1999), Zimbabwean swimmer
Chase Ortiz (born 1985), American football player
Chase Osborn (1860–1949), American politician
Chase Owens (born 1990), American professional wrestler

P
Chase Page (born 1983), American football player
Chase Parker (golfer) (born 1991), American golfer
Chase N. Peterson (1929–2014), American physician
Chase Petty (born 2003), American baseball player
Chase Pistone (born 1983), American racing driver
Chase Pittman (born 1983), American football player
Chase Polacek (born 1989), American ice hockey player
Chase Price (1731–1777), British politician
Chase Purdy (born 1999), American stock car racing driver

R
Chase Rettig (born 1991), American football player
Chase Reynolds (born 1987), American football player
Chase Rice (born 1985), American singer-songwriter
Chase Riddle (1925–2011), American baseball player
Chase F. Robinson (born 1963), American historian
Chase Roullier (born 1993), American football player

S
Chase Sanborn (born 1956), Canadian trumpeter
Chase Seiffert (born 1991), American golfer
Chase Sherman (born 1989), American mixed martial artist
Chase Shugart (born 1996), American baseball player
Chase Silseth (born 2000), American baseball player
Chase Simon (born 1989), American basketball player
Chase Stanley (born 1989), New Zealand rugby league footballer
Chase Stevens (born 1979), American professional wrestler
Chase Stillman (born 2003), American ice hockey player
Chase Stokes, American actor
Chase Strangio (born 1982), American lawyer
Chase Strumpf (born 1998), American baseball player

T
Chase Tan (born 1991), Singaporean actor
Chase Tang (born 1988), Taiwanese-Canadian actor
Chase Tapley (born 1991), American basketball player
Chase Tatum (1973–2008), American professional wrestler
Chase Tenpenny (born 1991), American football player
Chase Thomas (born 1989), American football player
Chase Twichell (born 1950), American poet

U
Chase Untermeyer (born 1946), American diplomat
Chase Utley (born 1978), American baseball player

V
Chase Vaughn (born 1988), American football player
Chase Vosvick (born 1998), American soccer player

W
Chase Walker (born 1998), American singer-songwriter
Chase R. Whitcher (1876–1940), American architect
Chase Whiteside (born 1988), American filmmaker
Chase Whitley (born 1989), American baseball player
Chase Wileman (born 1986), American soccer coach
Chase Williamson (born 1988), American actor
Chase Winovich (born 1995), American football player
Chase Sui Wonders (born 1996), Chinese-American actress
Chase G. Woodhouse (1890–1984), American activist
Chase Wright (disambiguation), multiple people

Y
Chase Young (disambiguation), multiple people

Fictional characters
Chase Stein, a character in the comic book series Marvel Comics

See also
Chase (surname), a page for people surnamed "Chase"
Chase (disambiguation), a disambiguation page for "Chase"

References

English masculine given names
English unisex given names